The Shulin Refuse Incineration Plant is an incinerator in Shulin District, New Taipei, Taiwan.

History
The construction of the plant started in 1992 and completed in 1995. It began its commercial operation the same year.

Technical details
The plant has a capacity of treating 450 tons of garbage per day in each of its three boilers. As of 2020, it received a total of 17,685 tons of garbage annually and incinerated 18,876 tons of them.

Transportation
The plant is accessible within walking distance south west of Shanjia Station of Taiwan Railways.

See also
 Air pollution in Taiwan

References

External links

 

1995 establishments in Taiwan
Buildings and structures in New Taipei
Incinerators in New Taipei
Infrastructure completed in 1995